The Knockout Stage of the 1994 Federation Cup Asia/Oceania Zone was the final stage of the Zonal Competition involving teams from Asia and Oceania. Those that qualified for this stage placed first and second in their respective pools.

The four teams were then randomly drawn into a two-stage knockout tournament, with the winner qualifying for the World Group.

Draw

Semifinals

Philippines vs. New Zealand

Thailand vs. Chinese Taipei

Final

New Zealand vs. Chinese Taipei

See also
Fed Cup structure

References

External links
 Fed Cup website

1994 Federation Cup Asia/Oceania Zone